Kiffa Airport  is an airport serving Kiffa, a city in the Assaba region of southern Mauritania.

References

External links
 

Airports in Mauritania
Assaba Region